7 or Seven is an album by Zap Mama, released in 1997 on Luaka Bop Records.

Production
The album moved away from strictly a capella forms, incorporating more instrumentation and hip hop influences.

Critical reception
Westword wrote that "the songs feature percussion, guitar, drums and assorted string instruments ... the all-female format has been ditched in favor of a more diverse crew of musicians who work to support Daulne's haunting vocals." The Chicago Tribune wrote that "Daulne's already eclectic vision is stretched to the breaking point, incorporating blues, hip hop, funk and reggae voicings with rhythms from Morocco and Mali." Tucson Weekly wrote that the songs "open a sensual, multicultural dialogue, seamlessly weaving together diverse genres--Pygmy chants, pop world beats, hip hop, and reggae--and incorporating the influences of collaborators like rasta man U-Roy and Spearhead's Michael Franti."

Track listing
Jogging À Tombouctou (Anita Daulne, Bachir Attar, Fadimata Wallet, Mama Camberlin, Marie Daulne, Sabine Kabongo; arr. M. Daulne/S. Kabongo) 4:59
New World (A, Daulne, M. Daulne, U-Roy; arr. JL Daulne, Ange Nawasadio)) 3:15
Baba Hooker (M. Daulne, Michael Franti; arr. M. Daulne, Franti) 5:24
Belgo Zairoise (M. Daulne; arr. M. Daulne, S. Kabongo) 5:22
African Sunset (Alpheus Mnyandu; arr. M. Daulne, S. Kabongo) 4:53
Damn your Eyes (Barbara Myrick, Steve Bogard; arr. A. Daulne, M. Daulne, Aningi, S. Kabongo) 4:07
Poetry Man (Phoebe Snow; arr. Franti) 4:57
Warmth (M. Daulne, Angilique Willkie; arr. M. Daulne) 5:33
Téléphone (M. Daulne, Cecilia Kankonda; arr. A. & M. Daulne) 3:48
Nostalgie Amoureuse (Willkie, M. Daulne; arr. M. Daulne) 5:13
Timidity (M. Daulne, Kabongo, A Horse A Bucket and a Spoon; arr. M. Daulne, S. Kabongo) 3:05
Eie Buma (A. Daulne, M. Daulne; arr. A. & M. Daulne) 3:19
Kesia Yanga (M. Daulne; arr. M. Daulne) 5:23
Illioi (M. Daulne, Willkie; arr. M. Daulne) 5:33

Personnel
Marie Daulne: Lead Vocal, Percussion, Didgeridoo, Guimbri, Shekere (Kashishi)
Fatimata Wallet, Mama Camberlin, Sabine Kabongo, Watanga Rema, U-Roy, Michael Franti, Angilique Willkie, Jean-Louis Daulne, Bernadette Aningi, Quental Kesia: Additional Vocals
Amanou, Dizzy Mandjeku, David James, Tom Van Stiphout: Guitars
Yannic Fonderie, Hans Francken: Keyboards
Carl Young: Bass, Keyboards
Luk Michiels, Michel Hatzidjordju: Bass (Michiels also played double bass)
Vincent Piernes: Double Bass
Otti Van Der Werf: Guimbri
Charlie Hunter: Harmonica
Stephane Galland, Bruno Meeus, Bilou Doneaux: Drums, Percussion
Sidiki Diabat: Shekere

Production
Produced By Marie Daulne, Yannick Fonderie & Michael Franti
Co-Producers: Anita Daulne & Sabine Kabongo
Recorded & Engineered By Mister Big Jo Francken (instruments) & Erwin Autrique (vocals)
Mixed By Erwin Autrique, Mister Big Jo Francken & Michael Franti
Mastered By Tony Cousins
Photography By Jurgen Rogiers

References

External links
"7" at discogs

1997 albums
Virgin Records albums